Harrison Thomas Clarke (born 2 March 2001) is an English professional footballer who plays as a defender for Ipswich Town.

Club career

Early career
Born in Ipswich, Clarke began his career with Ipswich Town having been scouted at Brantham Athletic. He joined Arsenal as a youth player in 2015. In August 2018, he signed his first professional contract, which was renewed in December 2019.

Oldham Athletic
In October 2020, Clarke joined Oldham Athletic on loan until January 2021. On 20 October 2020, he came off the bench in the 85th minute and made his debut in a 1–1 draw against Carlisle United in League Two. On 3 November, he scored his first competitive goal in a 2–1 victory over Cheltenham Town in the league. On 22 January 2021, the loan was extended for the remainder of the 2020–21 season.

Ross County
On 2 August 2021, Clarke was loaned to Scottish Premiership side Ross County for the 2021–22 season. The loan came to an end on 3 January 2022.

Hibernian
On 6 January 2022, Clarke was loaned to Scottish Premiership side Hibernian. Clarke missed several weeks due to injury, and made his debut (and scored) on 2 April in a 1–1 draw with Dundee United. The loan had been due to run for 18 months, but Arsenal exercised a break clause in the deal during June 2022.

Stoke City
On 20 June 2022, Clarke joined Stoke City on loan for the 2022–23 season. Clarke made 20 appearances for Stoke, scoring twice against Blackpool and Burnley before being recalled by Arsenal in January 2023.

Ipswich Town
In January 2023, Clarke joined Ipswich Town for an undisclosed fee. He had previously played for the club at youth level, prior to joining Arsenal's academy in 2015.

International career
Clarke has represented England at under-17 youth level.

Playing style
Clarke began his career as a midfielder but was converted to a defender when he joined Arsenal in 2015. Arsenal described Clarke as "capable of playing as a right back or as a central defender" who "has taken his qualities as a midfielder into defence, looking to play the ball forwards whenever possible".

Career statistics

References

2001 births
Living people
English footballers
England youth international footballers
Association football defenders
Ipswich Town F.C. players
Arsenal F.C. players
Oldham Athletic A.F.C. players
Ross County F.C. players
Hibernian F.C. players
Stoke City F.C. players
English Football League players
Scottish Professional Football League players